is a village located in Gunma Prefecture, Japan. , the village had an estimated population of 1,149 in 571 households, and a population density of 6.3 persons per km2. The village has the lowest population density of any municipality in Japan.

Geography
Ueno is located in the extreme mountainous southwestern portion of Gunma Prefecture, bordered by Saitama Prefecture to the south and Nagano Prefecture to the west.

 Mountains
 Mount Suwa
 Mount Osutaka (1639m)
 Mount Takamagahara (1979m)
 Rivers
 Kanna River

Surrounding municipalities
Gunma Prefecture
 Nanmoku
 Kanna
Saitama Prefecture
 Chichibu
 Ogano
Nagano Prefecture
 Kawakami
 Minamiaiki
 Kitaaiki
 Sakuho

Climate
Ueno has a Humid continental climate (Köppen Dfb) characterized by warm summers and cold winters with heavy snowfall.  The average annual temperature in Ueno is 8.0 °C. The average annual rainfall is 1479 mm with September as the wettest month. The temperatures are highest on average in August, at around 20.6 °C, and lowest in January, at around -4.2 °C.

Demographics
Per Japanese census data, the population of Ueno peaked in the 1950s and is now only a quarter of what it was a century ago.

History
During the Edo period, the area of present-day Ueno was part of the tenryō territory administered directly by the Tokugawa shogunate in Kōzuke Province.

Ueno village was established within Minamikanra District, Gunma Prefecture on April 1, 1889, with the creation of the modern municipalities system after the Meiji Restoration. In 1896,  Minamikanra District was united with Midono and Tago Districts to create Tano District.  On August 12, 1985, Japan Airlines Flight 123, heading from Haneda Airport to Itami Airport, crashed into an area within the Ueno Village limits, killing 520 people in the world's deadliest single-aircraft aviation accident.

The village rejected the central's governments directives on Municipal mergers and dissolutions in Japan. Despite its depopulation, revenue from Ueno Dam and the Tokyo Electric Kannagawa Power Station give the local government the highest financial strength index in the prefecture.

Government
Ueno has a mayor-council form of government with a directly elected mayor and a unicameral town council of eight members. Ueno, together with the city of Fujioka and village of Ueno contributes two members to the Gunma Prefectural Assembly. In terms of national politics, the town is part of Gunma 4th district of the lower house of the Diet of Japan.

Economy
The economy of Ueno is heavily dependent on agriculture and forestry.

Education
Ueno has one public elementary school and one public middle school operated by the village government. The village does not have a high school.

Transportation

Railway
Ueno does not have any passenger railway service.

Bus
Ueno Village Bus comes from Joshin Electric Railway Shimonita Station, and Nippon Chuo Bus Okutano Line comes from JR East Shinmachi Station (Gunma)

Highway

International relations
 – Zhuolan, Miaoli, Taiwan

Local attractions

Ueno Dam
Ueno Sky Bridge - The Ueno skybridge is a 225 metre long pedestrian suspension bridge. At a height of 90 metre, it offers scenic views.
Shionosawa Onsen

References

External links

Official Website 

Villages in Gunma Prefecture
Ueno, Gunma